Edward "Ed" James Swearingen (12 September 1925 – 15 May 2014) was an aeronautical engineer based in San Antonio, Texas.

Life
Swearingen was notable for developing modifications from existing production aircraft such as the Piper PA-30 Twin Comanche from the Piper PA-24 Comanche single engine series and the Swearingen Merlin turboprop aircraft from the Beech Model 50 Twin Bonanza. Swearingen also developed original aircraft designs such as the SX-300 experimental airplane and Sino Swearingen SJ30-2 executive jet.

References

External links
Living Legend Ed Swearingen’s Lifetime of Invention - Airport Journals, May 2009

2014 deaths
1925 births
American aerospace engineers